Milkov Point (‘Milkov Nos’ \'mil-kov 'nos\) is a conspicuous rocky point on the east side of Lanchester Bay formed by an offshoot of Chanute Peak on Davis Coast in Graham Land on the Antarctic Peninsula.

The point is named for the Bulgarian pioneer of aviation Radul Milkov (1883–1962) who, while on a combat air mission with Prodan Tarakchiev during the First Balkan War, used the first aerial bombs on October 16, 1912; in association with other names of pioneers of aviation in the area.

Location
German-British mapping in 1996.

Map
 Trinity Peninsula. Scale 1:250000 topographic map No. 5697. Institut für Angewandte Geodäsie and British Antarctic Survey, 1996.

Notes

References
 Milkov Point. SCAR Composite Gazetteer of Antarctica.
 Bulgarian Antarctic Gazetteer. Antarctic Place-names Commission. (details in Bulgarian, basic data in English)

External links
 Milkov Point. Copernix satellite image

Headlands of Graham Land
Bulgaria and the Antarctic
Davis Coast